Belarus competed at the 2011 World Aquatics Championships in Shanghai, China between July 16 and 31, 2011.

Medalists

Diving

Belarus has qualified 2 athletes in diving.

Men

Swimming

Belarus qualified 7 swimmers.

Men

Women

Synchronised swimming

Belarus has qualified 3 athletes in synchronised swimming.

Women

Reserve
Iya Navaselskaya

References

Nations at the 2011 World Aquatics Championships
2011 in Belarusian sport
Belarus at the World Aquatics Championships